The beginning of women's badminton in Australia dates back to the year 1900, when for the first time badminton was played in Australia.

History
The first regional badminton championships were held in 1932 in Victoria followed by the first national championships in 1935.
In 1934, the Victorian Women's Centennial Sports Carnival was held.  The event was organised by the Victorian Women's Amateur Sports Council and held at the Melbourne Cricket Grounds. The purpose was to increase women's interest in sport by providing them opportunities to play.  Sports that were included on the programme included cricket, field hockey, women's basketball, bowls, rowing, swimming, athletics, rifle shooting, baseball, golf, tennis and badminton. There were over 1,000 bowlers involved over the course a week.  Cricket featured a match versus a visiting English side.  Women's basketball featured a Victorian side playing against a representative all Australian side.  There was a day for watersports such as swimming and rowing.  A tennis tournament was held. A field hockey tournament featuring Australian, Kiwi and Fijian teams was played.

In 1940, a study of 314 women in New Zealand and Australia was done. Most of the women in the study were middle class, conservative, Protestant and white. The study found that 183 participated in sport.  The ninth most popular sport that these women participated in was croquet, with 3 having played the sport.  The sport was tied with billiards, chess, fishing, field hockey, horse racing, squash, table tennis and shooting.

Australian women's sports had an advantage over many other women's sport organisations around the world in the period after World War II. Women's sport organisations had largely remained intact and were holding competitions during the war period.  This structure survived in the post war period.  Women's sport were not hurt because of food rationing, petrol rationing, population disbursement, and other issues facing post-war Europe.

Tournaments
There are organized many national badminton tournaments for all age groups in Australia. Most of the tournaments are open for male and for female contestants together. Team, singles, doubles and mixed doubles tournaments are held, where singles, doubles and mixed doubles events are in the most cases held together during one and the same tournament. The most important national tournaments are the Australian national championships, the Clendinnen Shield, the H. B. Wray Trophy, the C. Maddern Trophy, the Melbourne Silver Bowl and Australian ranking tournaments. Australian championships were open for international contestants until the end of the 1990s. In the meantime the Australian championships were divided into an international one (Australia Open championships or Australia International) and a national one (Australia closed championships).

On the international level, Australia organizes the already mentioned Australia Open championships and alternating with New Zealand the team competition for the Whyte Trophy. The Australian teams and players participate in all major tournaments of the BWF. In single and doubles tournaments, the players participate for instance in the World championships, Oceania championships, Commonwealth games and the BWF Super Series. The mixed national team competes in the Sudirman Cup, the women's team in the Uber Cup. Australia did not participate in the first women's world team championship in 1957. In the second championship Australia lost in the final of the preliminary round to New Zealand.

Australian national champions: Ladies Singles
 1935 - Mavis Horsburgh
 1936 - Mavis Horsburgh
 1937 - Mavis Horsburgh
 1938 - Eva Robert
 1939 - Beryl Cuthbertson
 1940-1946 - no championship held
 1947 - Eva Robert
 1948 - Eva Robert
 1949 - Eva Robert
 1950 - Ethel Peacock
 1951 - Eva Robert
 1951 - Ethel Peacock
 1953 - Ethel Peacock
 1954 - Amy Pincott
 1955 - Margaret Foord
 1956 - June Bevan
 1957 - Margaret Russell
 1958 - Margaret Russell
 1960 - June Bevan
 1982 - Maxine Evans
 1989 - Anna Lao
 1990 - Susi Susanti
 1991 - Anna Lao
 1992 - Song Yang
 1993 - Song Yang
 1994 - Lisa Campbell
 1995 - Lisa Campbell
 1996 - Lisa Campbell
 1997 - Li Feng
 1998 - Michaela Smith
 2003 - Renuga Veeran
 2006 - Tania Luiz
 2007 - Leanne Choo
 2008 - Leanne Choo
 2009 - Renuga Veeran
 2010 - Leisha Cooper
 2011 - Michelle (Xi) Zhang

References

Bibliography

 
 

Badminton
Badminton in Australia